Jack Stephens (born 27 January 1994) is an English professional footballer who plays as a defender for Premier League club AFC Bournemouth on loan from Southampton.

Born in Torpoint, Stephens began his career as a youth player with Plymouth Argyle, remaining with the club as a professional until 2011. Although starting his career as a right back, Stephens has recently been converted into a centre back. He can also operate as a left back, or in a defensive midfielder role, and has played internationally for the England under-18, under-19 and under-20 sides.

Club career

Plymouth Argyle
Born in Torpoint, Cornwall, Stephens attended Torpoint Community College, and joined Plymouth Argyle in 2005 at the age of 11. He progressed to the club's youth team in 2009 after a number of impressive performances in the junior section of the Milk Cup. He was then promoted to the club's reserve team, having appeared regularly in the Youth Alliance. Stephens began training with the club's first team in September 2010 and was included in an 18-man squad for their league match against Sheffield Wednesday. He made his debut as a late substitute in a 3–2 win for Argyle. Primarily a right back, Stephens can play in a variety of positions. "Jack is a right-back but he can play in the centre as well. He's comfortable in both positions," said John James, the club's youth development officer. "I like him at right-back because he does get forward well, he's quick, he likes to take people on and he's a good header of the ball. He's a big lad – 6ft 1in I think – and he's still growing."

Southampton

2011–2014 
He joined Southampton on 5 April 2011 for a fee of £150,000, signing an initial three-year contract, and was placed in the club's development squad. Stephens made his first-team debut for Southampton in a 2–1 FA Cup win against Coventry City on 7 January 2012, coming on as a second-half substitute for Dan Harding. In 2012, he was promoted to the first team ahead of the club's return to the Premier League.

2014–2016: Loan moves 
On 13 March 2014, Stephens joined League One side Swindon Town on loan until 3 May. He was re-signed on 1 September 2014 on loan until January 2015, and this deal was extended until the end of the season. He scored his first career goal on 17 January 2015, heading Harry Toffolo's cross to open a 3–1 win over Chesterfield at the County Ground.

On 31 July 2015, Stephens signed a two-year contract extension, taking his deal to the summer of 2019, and subsequently completed a season-long move to Championship side Middlesbrough. In January 2016 however, he was recalled by manager Ronald Koeman who was not happy that Stephens had only been played in one league match for Boro. On 1 February, Stephens joined League One side Coventry City on loan for the remainder of the season.

2016–2022 
Stephens made his Premier League debut on 2 January 2017, coming on as a first half substitute replacing the injured Cédric Soares, in a 3–0 defeat at Everton.

He scored his first goal for Southampton on 27 January 2018, in the 1–0 victory over Watford in the FA Cup, which was followed by his first Premier League goal four days later, when he equalised in a 1–1 draw with south coast rivals, Brighton & Hove Albion. His third goal in as many matches came in a 3–2 victory over fellow strugglers West Bromwich Albion on 3 February.

2022–present: Loan to AFC Bournemouth 
On 1 September 2022, Stephens joined Bournemouth on a season-long loan.

International career

Stephens received his first call-up for the England under-18 side for a match against Poland in March 2012, playing the first half of the 3–0 win at Crewe Alexandra home ground Alexandra Stadium. Later in the year he made the step up to the under-19 team, making his debut on 26 September in a 3–0 win over Estonia in the qualifying stages of the 2013 European Championships, playing the full 90 minutes. He later played 45 minutes of the 6–0 win over the Faroe Islands on 28 September (after which he was replaced by fellow Southampton player Calum Chambers, who scored the sixth goal), the full 90 minutes of the 1–1 draw with Ukraine on 1 October, and the first half of the 13 November 1–0 friendly win over Finland which also featured Southampton midfielder James Ward-Prowse. Stephens made his debut for the England under-21 side on 12 November 2015 in a 0–0 draw against Bosnia and Herzegovina, but was sent off in the 72nd minute.

He was part of the team that won the 2016 Toulon Tournament, their first such win for 22 years.

Career statistics

Honours
Southampton
EFL Cup runner-up: 2016–17

England U21
Toulon Tournament: 2016

References

External links

Jack Stephens profile at the Southampton F.C. website
Jack Stephens profile at the Football Association website

1994 births
Living people
People from Torpoint
Footballers from Cornwall
English footballers
England youth international footballers
Association football defenders
Plymouth Argyle F.C. players
Southampton F.C. players
Swindon Town F.C. players
Middlesbrough F.C. players
Coventry City F.C. players
AFC Bournemouth players
English Football League players
Premier League players